Třebechovice pod Orebem is a town in Hradec Králové District in the Hradec Králové Region of the Czech Republic. It has about 5,700 inhabitants. Třebechovice pod Orebem is best known for the Museum of Nativity Scenes.

Administrative parts
Villages of Krňovice, Nepasice, Polánky nad Dědinou and Štěnkov are administrative parts of Třebechovice pod Orebem.

Geography
It lies in the Orlice Table. The town is situated beneath the hill Oreb, which is one of symbols of the town. It was named by the Hussites in 1419 after the biblical Mount Horeb.

The river Orlice flows across the southern part of the territory. The Dědina River flows through the urban area until the confluence with the Orlice. The Cihelnický Stream flows through the western part of the territory and also flows into the Orlice in the municipal territory.

History
Třebechovice was founded in the 14th century. According to legend, the town was founded on the right bank of the river Dědina by Třeboch who brought his people there and gave the name to the town. In the 14th century, the town was owned by Hynek Hlaváč of Dubé and his descendants until 1450, when Přibík Kroměšín of Březovice became an owner. The town was owned by the Trčka of Lípa family in the 16th century and it economically developed.

In 1628, a large peasant uprising broke out in the region. Třebechovice was fined, which contributed to the impoverishment of the population. The decline of the town was deepened by four major fires in the 17th century. The economic and cultural situation was bad until the 19th century, when business began to develop again and cultural organizations were founded. In 1849, the serfdom was abolished and the town became independent. In 1920, the town's name was changed to Třebechovice pod Orebem.

Demographics

Sights

The Church of Saint Andrew was first mentioned in 1384. It was damaged by fires and renewed in 1572–1575. The tower was replaced in 1864.

The Evangelical church on the town square is a Neo-Romanesque building from 1877. It serves both religious and cultural purposes.

In 1528, a small wooden church was built on the Oreb hill at the command of Zdeněk Trčka of Lípa. This church fell into disrepair and was replaced by new one in 1835. The new church is called Church of Corpus Christi.

The Museum of Nativity Scenes
The Museum of Nativity Scenes was founded in 1925 by Vilém Koleš. There are more than 500 exhibits of nativity scenes. The museum is the only one of its kind in the country. The most valuable nativity scene is Probošt's mechanical Christmas crib created from wood, which includes more than 2,000 carved parts and figures.

The museum also manages the town's collections. The most valuable exhibit is the handwritten illuminated Literary Gradual from 1559.

Notable people
Jan Theobald Held (1770–1851), physician, educator and composer
Anka Bergman (1917–2013), Holocaust survivor
Oldřich Rott (born 1951), footballer
Jan Doležal (born 1996), decathlete

Twin towns – sister cities

Třebechovice pod Orebem is twinned with:
 Bethlehem, Palestine

Gallery

References

External links

Cities and towns in the Czech Republic
Populated places in Hradec Králové District